
Todos Santos Lake is a lake in the Beni Department / Santa Cruz Department, Bolivia. At an elevation of 193 m, its surface area is 4.12 km².

References 

Lakes of Beni Department
Lakes of Santa Cruz Department (Bolivia)